The princely houses of Poland and Lithuania differed from other princely houses in Europe. Most importantly, Polish nobility (szlachta) could not be granted nobility titles by the Polish kings in the Polish-Lithuanian Commonwealth. Therefore, the title of prince either dated to the times before the Union of Lublin, which created the Commonwealth in 1569, or was granted to some nobles (usually magnates) by foreign kings. Due to the longstanding history of common statehood,  some noble families often described as "Polish" actually originated in Grand Duchy of Lithuania and are of Lithuanian or Ruthenian descent. Some houses are more correctly described as being of Polish-Lithuanian Commonwealth.

Kingdom of Poland

Duchy of Pomerania

Polish–Lithuanian Commonwealth

Old Lithuanian Gediminid and Ruthenian (Rurikid) Princely Houses

Princely Houses with Tatar origin  
These princely houses lived like average rich nobility, but sometimes part of these lived like peasants.

 Ahmetowicz
 Achmetowicz
 Adamowicz
 Aksak, Axak
 Apanowicz-Białobłocki
 Assanczukowicz
 Assanowicz
 Bahryński
 Bartoszewicz
 Begimowicz
 Berbasz
 Bierbasz
 Birbasz
 Bohdanowicz
 Bułhak
 Chazbiejewicz
 Dawidowicz
 Fursowicz
 Gliński
 Grocholski
 Haraburda
 Jachicz
 Juchowski
 Jurewicz
 Juszyński
 Kadyszewicz Kejdysz
 Kambułatowicz
 Karaczewicz
 Kasymowicz
 Kieński
 Kiński
 Kordysz
 Korycki
 Korzon
 Kotłubaj
 Kryczyński
 Lebiedziewski
 Lipski
 Łostajski
 Łowczycki
 Malibakszycz
 Maluszycki
 Małyszycki
 Maślakiewicz
 Minbułatowicz
 Najman-Kadyszewicz
 Niekraszewicz
 Nowosielski
 Obulewicz
 Okęcki
 Ostryński
 Petyhorski
 Piotrowski
 Puński
 Rodkiewicz-Szpakowski
 Rudnicki
 Sayna-Kryczyński
 Siehdziński
 Skirmunt
 Smólski
 Sołtan
 Starzyński
 Sulimanowicz
 Sulkiewicz
 Szymkowicz
 Szyryński
 Talkowski
 Tarak-Buczacki
 Taraszewski
 Tuhan-Baranowski
 Ułan
 Ułan-Maluszycki
 Waliła-Łowczycki
 Zawacki
 Zackiewicz-Sulimanowicz

Princely titles granted by foreign monarchs

Kingdom of Poland (Congress Poland)

See also
 List of Polish rulers
 List of szlachta
 List of Polish titled nobility
 Magnates of Poland and Lithuania

References

Further reading 
 Konarski S., 1958, Armorial de la noblesse polonaise titrée, Paris.
 Kowalski M., 2007, Księstwa w przestrzeni politycznej I Rzeczpospolitej, [w:] I. Kiniorska, S. Sala (red.), Rola geografii społeczno-ekonomicznej w badaniach regionalnych, Instytut Geografii AŚ, PTG, Kielce, 2007, s. 177-186.
 Leitgeber S., 1993, Nowy Almanach Błękitny, Oficyna Wydawnicza „Audiutor”, Poznań-Warszawa.
 Olszewski H., 1969, Ustrój polityczny Rzeczpospolitej (w:) Tazbir J. (red.), Polska XVII wieku – państwo, społeczeństwo, kultura. Wiedza Powszechna, Warszawa, s. 52-83
 Niesiecki K., Herbarz Polski (Polish Armorial) full title: "Korona Polska przy złotey wolnosci starożytnemi Rycerstwa Polskiego y Wielkiego Xięstwa Litewskiego kleynotami naywyższymi Honorami Heroicznym, Męstwem y odwagą, Wytworną Nauką a naypierwey Cnotą, nauką Pobożnością, y Swiątobliwością ozdobiona Potomnym zaś wiekom na zaszczyt y nieśmiertelną sławę Pamiętnych w tey Oyczyźnie Synow podana TOM ... Przez X. Kaspra Niesieckego Societatis Jesu", Lwów, 1738.
 "Korona Polska..." vol. 1
 "Korona Polska..." vol. 2
 "Korona Polska..." vol. 3
 "Korona Polska..." vol. 4
 Edition expanded by other authors: Herbarz Polski... vol. 4-10, published by Jan Nepomucen de Bobrowicz, Leipzig, 1841
 Jasienica P., Myśli o dawnej Polsce, Warszawa: Czytelnik, 1990, OCLC 69526168
 Klubówna A., Królowa Jadwiga. Warszawa 1986
 Tęgowski J., Krąg rodzinny Jarosława Bogorii (w:) Genealogia – polska elita polityczna na tle porównawczym, Toruń 1993